Lee Hong-bin (born September 29, 1993), also known by the mononym Hongbin, is a South Korean singer, actor, entertainer and streamer formerly signed under Jellyfish Entertainment. He debuted as a member of the South Korean boy group VIXX in May 2012, and began his acting career in 2014 in SBS' romantic drama Glorious Day as Yoo Ji-ho. He has since had a leading role in KBS2's fantasy action-romance Moorim School: Saga of the Brave (2016) as Wang Chi-ang. In 2017, Hongbin played Yoon Jae-won in the SBS Plus rom-com mini-drama Wednesday 3:30 PM. He officially left VIXX in August 2020.

Early life
Hongbin was born and raised in Jayang-dong, Seoul, South Korea. His family consists of himself, his parents and two older sisters. Hongbin studied Musical major at Dong-ah Broadcasting College. He stayed at a Buddhist temple with his grandmother when he was a child before returning to his parents in Jayang-dong.

Career

2012-2014: Debut with VIXX and acting debut

Hongbin was one of ten trainees who were contestants in Mnet's survival reality show MyDOL and was chosen to be a part of the final line-up and the six-member boy group finally debuted with "Super Hero" on May 24, 2012 on M! Countdown. During MyDOL; Hongbin was featured in Brian Joo's "Let This Die" and Seo In-guk's "Tease Me" music video.

In 2014, Hongbin was cast in the SBS week drama Glorious Day.

2015–2018: MC-ing and acting career continues
On March 3, 2015, Hongbin joined T-ara's Jiyeon and Super Junior-M's Zhou Mi as MC on SBS MTV's The Show from March 3, 2015 to October 13, 2015. In September 2015, Hongbin was cast in his first lead role as Wang Chi-ang in KBS2's action-romance drama Moorim School: Saga of the Brave.

In September 2016, Hongbin was cast alongside fellow VIXX member N and AOA's Chanmi in the web drama What's Up With These Kids? which was air on Naver TV Cast on November 16.

In March 2017, Hongbin was cast in a rom-com mini drama Wednesday 3:30 PM on SBS Plus.

In 2018, Hongbin was cast as a high school student who was born with hearing impairment in KBS's 10-episode drama Shining Sounds, which was broadcast on National Disabled Persons Day. The same year, he was cast in the romantic comedy drama Witch's Love, and mystery thriller The Smile Has Left Your Eyes.

2019–present: Music career, variety shows, departure from VIXX, streaming

On July 10, 2019, Hongbin and Monsta X's Hyungwon released a collaboration song titled "Cool Love".

On August 4, 2019, Hongbin was announced to be one of the cast members on the Mnet reality show Love Catcher 2.

It was announced on August 7, 2020, by Jellyfish Entertainment that he decided to leave VIXX due to personal reasons.

Upon his return from the military, Hongbin now streams on Twitch full time.

Personal life
Hongbin enlisted in the military in August 2020 and was discharged on February 25, 2022, without returning to active duty in accordance with the Ministry of Defense's COVID-19 Regulations.

Filmography

Television series

Variety show

Discography

See also
VIXX discography
List of awards and nominations received by VIXX

References

External links

 

Jellyfish Entertainment artists
VIXX members
Japanese-language singers of South Korea
South Korean dance music singers
South Korean male idols
South Korean pop singers
South Korean male singers
South Korean male television actors
People from Seoul
Musicians from Seoul
Male actors from Seoul
1993 births
Living people
Dong-ah Institute of Media and Arts alumni
21st-century South Korean singers
Singers from Seoul
Twitch (service) streamers